The 1926 municipal election was held December 13, 1926, to elect a mayor and six aldermen to sit on Edmonton City Council and three trustees to sit on the public school board. Harry Carrigan, J O Pilon, and W D Trainor were acclaimed to two-year terms on the separate school board.

There were ten aldermen on city council, but four of the positions were already filled: James East, James Findlay, Frederick Keillor (SS), and A C Sloane were all elected to two-year terms in 1925 and were still in office. James McCrie Douglas (SS) had also been elected in 1925, but had resigned to run for mayor; accordingly, L S C Dineen was elected to a one-year term.

There were seven trustees on the public school board, but four of the positions were already filled: Ralph Bellamy, Frank Crang (SS), F S MacPherson, and Elmer Roper had all been elected to two-year terms in 1925 and were still in office. The same was true on the separate board, where R Crossland (SS), Charles Gariepy, Thomas Magee, and A J Ryan were continuing.

The election of mayor was conducted using Alternative Voting; the election of councillors and school trustees was conducted using the single transferable vote system.

Voter turnout

There were 12720 ballots cast out of 35726 eligible voters, for a voter turnout of 35.6%.

Results

 bold or  indicates elected
 italics indicate incumbent
 "SS", where data is available, indicates representative for Edmonton's South Side, with a minimum South Side representation instituted after the city of Strathcona, south of the North Saskatchewan River, amalgamated into Edmonton on February 1, 1912.

Mayor

The mayoral election was conducted using Instant-runoff voting. No candidate had a majority of votes in the first count so the lowest-ranking candidates were eliminated and their votes were transferred based on back-up preferences marked by voters. Bury accumulated a majority of votes eventually and was declared the winner in the end.

Aldermen
Total valid votes 12,291.
Six seats to fill.
Quota (the number of votes that guarantees election): 1755
One southside candidate must be elected, even if none has quota.

Because of the single transferable vote system, although Tighe received more initial votes than Hazlitt (although not enough to capture a seat), he was not elected while initially-less-popular Hazlitt was. Hazlitt passed Tighe's vote total due to votes transferred from other candidates. 

Dineen was declared elected due to the southside guarantee.

The city clerk's conducting of this STV/PR vote was criticized and the next year the city held a plebiscite on whether to continue using the STV/PR system.

Public school trustees

Under the minimum South Side representation rule, Herlihy was elected over Lake and McBain. Later McBain challenged Herlihy's election and was given the school board seat.

Separate (Catholic) school trustees

Harry Carrigan, J O Pilon, and W D Trainor were acclaimed.

References

Election History, City of Edmonton: Elections and Census Office

1926
1926 elections in Canada
1926 in Alberta